Dryanassa erebactis is a moth in the Copromorphidae family, and the only species in the genus Dryanassa. It is found in Tahiti.

References

Natural History Museum Lepidoptera generic names catalog

Copromorphidae